The Primetime Emmy Award for Outstanding Costumes for a Miniseries, Movie, or Special is a retired award that was presented as part of the Primetime Emmy Awards. Until 1999, the category was divided to award costume designers and costume supervisors separately.

In 2015, this category and Outstanding Costumes for a Series were rearranged as Outstanding Costumes for a Period/Fantasy Series, Limited Series, or Movie and Outstanding Costumes for a Contemporary Series, Limited Series, or Movie.

Winners and nominations

1960s
Outstanding Individual Achievement in the Visual Arts

1970s
Outstanding Achievement in Costume Design

Outstanding Achievement in Costume Design for a Drama Special

1980s

1990s

2000s

2010s

Notes

References

External links
 The Emmy Awards, Information Please Database, Pearson PLC
 

Costume Design for a Miniseries, Movie, or Special
Costume design awards
Awards disestablished in 2014
Awards established in 1969